Arthur J. Nascarella (born November 18, 1944) is an American actor who has appeared in dozens of films, most often playing a mobster or police officer. Among his notable film credits include a corrupt cop in Cop Land (1997), the hypocritical ambulance Captain Barney in Martin Scorsese's film Bringing Out The Dead (1999) and fed-up casino boss, Nicky "Fingers" Bonnatto in The Cooler (2003). He is perhaps best known for playing the fictional mobster and caporegime Carlo Gervasi in the hit television series The Sopranos. He appeared in 28 episodes from 2002 to 2007.

Career
Nascarella served eight years in the United States Marine Corps, and was a member of the New York City Police Department for 21 years.

He's played roles in the Spike Lee films New Jersey Drive (1995), Clockers (1995), He Got Game (1998), Summer of Sam (1999) and BlacKkKlansman (2018). He also appeared and played roles in the films A Brooklyn State of Mind (1997), Witness to the Mob (1998), Happiness (1998), 54 (1998), Enemy of the State (1998), Knockaround Guys (2001), WiseGirls (2002), Jersey Guy (2003), The Cooler (2003), Running Scared (2006), World Trade Center (2006), Yonkers Joe (2008), and Solitary Man (2009).

He also had a small part as the yacht-owning bootlegger Louie Gavotte in the 2001 USA Network television film After the Storm. He appears on the Showtime series Billions as a local pizza shop owner named Bruno.

Awards
National Board of Review Award for Best Acting by an Ensemble for Happiness (1998)

Filmography

Film

Television

References

External links

American male film actors
American male television actors
American people of Italian descent
Living people
People from Suffolk County, New York
Male actors from New York (state)
New York City Police Department officers
United States Marines
Place of birth missing (living people)
1944 births